Roquecourbe is a commune in the Tarn department and Occitanie region of southern France.

The name of the settlement – Ròca Corba in Occitan – means "curved rock".

See also
Communes of the Tarn department

References

Communes of Tarn (department)